is a 2022 platform video game developed by HAL Laboratory and published by Nintendo for the Nintendo Switch. It is the thirteenth mainline installment in the Kirby series, as well as the first game in the series in full 3D, excluding spin-offs. The player controls Kirby in an adventure through the titular forgotten land called the New World to rescue Waddle Dees kidnapped by the ferocious Beast Pack. To complete each stage to save the Waddle Dees, Kirby can use a wide range of copy abilities to help battle enemies and progress.

Kirby and the Forgotten Land was well received by critics, praising its graphics, level design, gameplay, soundtrack, and amount of content, with some calling it among the best games in the series. Minor criticism was directed towards Kirby's control and repetitive mini-bosses. As of December 31, 2022, Kirby and the Forgotten Land has sold over 6.12 million copies worldwide, making it the best-selling game in the series as well as one of the best-selling games on Nintendo Switch.

Gameplay
Kirby and the Forgotten Land is the first platform game in the series with full 3D gameplay, where the player must guide Kirby through various different stages to save the Waddle Dees at the end. As in most Kirby games, Kirby can jump and slide as well as inhale enemies and objects which he can either spit out like projectiles or swallow to gain a copy ability. Alongside returning copy abilities, this game introduced two new copy abilities in the form of Drill and Ranger, as well as an upgrade system for copy abilities and a new "Mouthful Mode" where Kirby can swallow and control larger objects, such as cars and vending machines. Similar to Kirby Battle Royale and Kirby and the Rainbow Curse, a second player can join in and play as Bandana Waddle Dee, who uses a spear as his main form of attack.

The goal of each stage is to rescue the Waddle Dees, who are freed by finding them trapped in cages, as well as by accomplishing certain goals specific to each stage. Once rescued, they are returned to Waddle Dee Town, the main hub of the game. As the player rescues more Waddle Dees, the town size increases as well as unlocks minigames that the player can compete with others online for the top score. Among them include fishing, taking into a part-time job in a cantina, and a puzzle minigame akin to Kirby Tilt 'n' Tumble.  The game also supports Amiibo functionality.

Plot
One day on Planet Popstar, a dark vortex appears over Dream Land, sucking up everything in its path. Kirby is among those sucked into the vortex and finds himself in an abandoned civilization called the New World, where he discovers that the Waddle Dees from Dream Land are being kidnapped by the native wildlife, the Beast Pack. Eventually, he finds the destroyed Waddle Dee Town and a chinchilla-like creature called Elfilin, who helped the Waddle Dees settle there. After being rescued from the Beast Pack, Elfilin explains to Kirby that he and the Waddle Dees attempted to fight back but were overwhelmed. Kirby offers to help Elfilin rescue the missing Waddle Dees, and the two set off together.

As Kirby and Elfilin make their way through the New World, save Waddle Dees and defeat the Beast Pack's high council members, the two discover that Kirby's longtime rival King Dedede is helping the Beast Pack for unknown reasons. After being defeated, Dedede captures Elfilin and escapes, with Kirby in pursuit. Kirby frees Dedede from the Beast Pack's mind control and ascends into their center of operations, Lab Discovera, to find Elfilin while Dedede stays behind to hold off the remaining Beast Pack members. The lab's pre-recorded narration explains that a powerful extradimensional being dubbed ID-F86 tried to invade the New World, but was captured by the planet's inhabitants and placed in the lab, where its ability to create space-time rifts was researched. Thirty years after research began, ID-F86 split into Elfilin and Fecto Forgo during a "warp-experiment incident" to which Elfilin escaped in the chaos, while Fecto Forgo was placed in permanent suspended animation within Lab Discovera's Eternal Capsule.

Kirby then meets the leader of the Beast Pack, a lion named Leongar, who is holding Elfilin captive. Leongar explains that the previous inhabitants of the New World used ID-F86’s power to depart for "a land of dreams," and that he intends to do the same by reuniting Fecto Forgo with Elfilin. After Leongar is defeated, Fecto Forgo awakens; speaking through Leongar, they reveal that they had formed the Beast Pack by controlling Leongar, possessed King Dedede, and kidnapped the Waddle Dees in order to resume their invasion. They break free from the Eternal Capsule and absorb Leongar, the Beast Pack, and Elfilin to become their original form, Fecto Elfilis. Kirby manages to weaken Fecto Elfilis enough to free Elfilin, but Fecto Elfilis creates a large portal back to Popstar, planning to crash the two planets into each other. Kirby narrowly defeats Fecto Elfilis by ramming a semi-trailer truck into them; he and Elfilin then find themselves back in Dream Land, where the portal is still open. Using all his power, Elfilin seals the rift between the two worlds, with himself in the New World. In the credits, though, it is revealed that Elfilin is able to open rifts to Popstar, and the inhabitants of the two worlds have become friends.

However, Leongar's soul remains trapped in an alternate dimension called Forgo Dreams, created by Fecto Forgo's great psychic power and populated by phantoms generated by their memories of the Beast Pack. Kirby and Elfilin travel to this dimension and rescue Leongar, who is possessed by Soul Forgo. Kirby defeats the possessed Leongar, separating Soul Forgo from his body. Before they can attack Kirby, a scarlet butterfly flies into the lab, absorbs them, and transforms into Morpho Knight, a valkyrie-like warrior who delivers souls to the afterlife. Kirby defeats Morpho Knight and Leongar, now Leon, is properly freed, though Soul Forgo partially absorbs Morpho Knight's power and vanishes in the aftermath. A mysterious portal opens within Waddle Dee Town's colosseum, and in an optional final encounter, Kirby combats the phantoms of Forgo Dreams before confronting the newly formed Chaos Elfilis. He defeats Chaos Elfilis in a final battle, and a lingering remnant of their soul approaches Elfilin. He accepts it into his heart, allowing his two halves to finally become whole.

Development
HAL Laboratory had begun teasing a new Kirby game since 2020. General director Shinya Kumazaki described it as the "new phase" for the series and that it will "culminate the best aspects of Kirby". Game director Tatsuya Kamiyama explained how the team focused on making the game approachable even with change of perspective to 3D, while at the same time making it satisfying to play to the player. The 3D transition was described as very challenging, as HAL Laboratory struggled with several failed attempts to bring the Kirby series into 3D, extending back to the 2000s — during early development of what became Kirby's Return to Dream Land. Kamiyama ultimately created a detailed pitch for a 3D Kirby game that presented solutions to the issues that HAL Laboratory had faced, including character design, gameplay and many other aspects, finally allowing for development to begin on a 3D title. Vanpool assisted in development of the game.

Early on, play testers at Nintendo felt that the wide 3D environments made gameplay too easy as players could simply step away from enemy attacks. They suggested that enemy density be increased, but HAL Laboratory declined, saying they did not want to "torment" Kirby or prevent players from peacefully exploring the game world. To mitigate issues with depth perception, the hit detection was altered so that an attack from Kirby will hit an enemy if it looks to have done so from the player's perspective, even if the attack did not actually connect.

A month before the September 2021 Nintendo Direct, the official Kirby website updated with placeholder text, further implying there was a new game coming soon. The game was first officially revealed in the Nintendo Direct on September 23, 2021, having been prematurely shown off on the Nintendo website six hours beforehand. A second, more in-depth trailer was shown on January 12, 2022, which announced more features of the game as well as the release date of March 25, 2022. A free-to-play demo was made available on March 3, 2022.

Reception

Kirby and the Forgotten Land received "generally favorable" reviews, according to review aggregator Metacritic. Critics hailed it as one of the best Kirby games ever made.

Several reviewers gave high praise to the exploration-based level design, citing the optional challenges, collectibles, and Treasure Road as elements that gave each level a substantial feel. The upgradable copy abilities and Mouthful Mode were also heavily praised for the gameplay variety they provided while remaining a part of the game's core design, making the combat and platforming consistently interesting as a result. Boss fights were also lauded for requiring the utilization of copy abilities, with several praising the increased difficulty of Forgotten Land in comparison to previous entries in the franchise. The game's visuals and level themes were similarly commended, with the post-apocalyptic aesthetic of the game being cited as creative. Local co-op was praised for being fun and seamless while accommodating younger players. The Waddle Dee Town hub was praised for encouraging player exploration and was deemed a substantially rewarding experience.

Minor criticism was directed towards the movement of Kirby for feeling limited and "sluggish", grounded environments, and the recurring mini-bosses that some found stale.

Sales
Kirby and the Forgotten Land launched at #1 in the UK, becoming both the series' first chart-topping debut and fourth best-selling Kirby game in the region. The game also launched at #1 in Japan with the series' best physical debut, at 380,060 copies sold in two days. The game sold 2.1 million units in two weeks.

As of December 31, 2022, Kirby and the Forgotten Land has sold 6.12 million copies worldwide.

Awards
Kirby and the Forgotten Land was one of ten games to receive an Excellence Award at Japan Game Awards 2022, and was also nominated for Nintendo Game of the Year at the Golden Joystick Awards. It won Best Family Game at The Game Awards 2022.

Notes

References

External links
 

2022 video games
3D platform games
Cooperative video games
HAL Laboratory games
Japan Game Award winners
Kirby (series) platform games
New York Game Award winners
Nintendo Switch games
Nintendo Switch-only games
Multiplayer and single-player video games
Post-apocalyptic video games 
Video games developed in Japan
Video games scored by Hirokazu Ando
Video games scored by Jun Ishikawa
Video games that use Amiibo figurines
The Game Awards winners